The Călmățui is a left tributary of the river Siret in Romania. It discharges into the Siret near the village Tudor Vladimirescu.

References

Rivers of Romania
Rivers of Galați County